Péter Kozma (born 16 May 1961) is a Hungarian alpine skier. He competed in two events at the 1984 Winter Olympics.

References

1961 births
Living people
Hungarian male alpine skiers
Olympic alpine skiers of Hungary
Alpine skiers at the 1984 Winter Olympics
People from Solothurn
20th-century Hungarian people